Tyler Arboretum is a nonprofit arboretum located at 515 Painter Road, Middletown Township, Delaware County, Pennsylvania. It is open daily except for major holidays; an admission fee is charged to non-members.
	
The property's history began in 1681, when William Penn signed a "lease and release" agreement with Thomas Minshall, an English Quaker, for property in Pennsylvania that contained the site now occupied by the arboretum. Between 1681 and 1944, the property was home to eight generations of the same family. The arboretum itself started in 1825 when two brothers, Jacob and Minshall Painter, set aside land to systematically plant more than 1,000 varieties of trees and shrubs. In 1944, descendant Laura Tyler bequeathed the property, in memorial to her husband John J. Tyler, to be a nonprofit arboretum.

It was added to the National Register of Historic Places in 2001.

Today, Tyler Arboretum attracts 70,000 visitors a year to its 650-acre campus and boasts 17 miles of pathways and hiking trails. The horticultural collections include the following major features:

 The original Painter Trees:  1. Lebanon Cedar (Cedrus libani), a Pennsylvania state champion; 2. Ginkgo (Ginkgo biloba); 3. Yulan Magnolia (Magnolia denudata), a Pennsylvania state champion; 4. Sugar Maple (Acer saccharum); 5. Red Maple (Acer rubrum) 6. Osage-orange (Maclura pomifera), blown down by a hurricane in 1954, just the rot-resistant trunk remains; 7. Cucumbertree Magnolia (Magnolia acuminata); 8. Baldcypress (Taxodium distichum); 9. Leatherleaf Mahonia (Mahonia bealei); 10. Tuliptree (Liriodendron tulipifera); 11. Yellow Buckeye (Aesculus flava); 12. River Birches - 2 (Betula nigra); 13. Giant Sequoia (Sequoiadendron giganteum), the largest giant sequoia in Pennsylvania and possibly in the eastern United States; 14. White Oaks -2 (Quercus alba); 15. Swamp White Oak (Quercus bicolor); 16. Sweetgums - 2 (Liquidambar styraciflua); 17. Corsican Pine (Pinus nigra spp. laricio); 18. Bald Cypress (Taxodium distichum); 19. American Linden (Tilia americana); 20. Common Pear (Pyrus communis); and 21. Oriental Spruce (Picea orientalis), a Pennsylvania state champion.
 Ornamentals: collections of flowering cherry (begun in 1951 with 45 plants representing 23 species and varieties); magnolia (begun 1951); crabapple (1951–1953); rhododendron (begun 1959 with more than 500 rhododendrons and 200 azaleas); holly; and lilac.
 Pinetum (34 ha / 85 acres, begun in 1954), containing pines, spruces, hemlocks, firs, cedars, cypresses and larches.
 Native Woodland Walk (begun in 1970).
 Meadow Maze, a recent four-ring labyrinth of meadow grasses based on a classical seven-ringed design.
 Pink Hill, a serpentine barren of serpentine stone with wildflowers.
 Uncultivated land (180 ha / 450 acres) that remain natural and contain 32 km / 17 miles of marked hiking trails.
 Wister Rhododendron Collection, a collection of more than 500 rhododendrons.

Gallery

See also 
 List of botanical gardens in the United States

References

External links 
 Tyler Arboretum
 Tyler Arboretum Writing Project

Parks on the National Register of Historic Places in Pennsylvania
Arboreta in Pennsylvania
Botanical gardens in Pennsylvania
Parks in Delaware County, Pennsylvania
Nature centers in Pennsylvania
Historic districts on the National Register of Historic Places in Pennsylvania
National Register of Historic Places in Delaware County, Pennsylvania
Protected areas of Delaware County, Pennsylvania